Hubert Negele (28 January 1919 – 23 November 1994) was a Liechtensteiner alpine skier who competed in the 1936 Winter Olympics.

References

External links
 

1919 births
1994 deaths
Liechtenstein male alpine skiers
Olympic alpine skiers of Liechtenstein
Alpine skiers at the 1936 Winter Olympics